The bare-necked umbrellabird (Cephalopterus glabricollis) is a species of bird in the family Cotingidae. It is found in the Talamancan montane forests of Costa Rica and Panama. Bare-necked umbrellabirds live only in forests and their diet consists mainly of fruits.

Its natural habitats are subtropical or tropical moist lowland forest and subtropical or tropical moist montane forest. It is threatened by habitat loss.

Taxonomy and systematics 
The bare-necked umbrellabird is one of three species in the genus Cephalopterus, commonly known as the umbrellabirds. The generic name Cephalopterus comes from the Greek κεφαλη (kephalē), meaning head, and πτερος (pteros), meaning feathered, referring to the head plumes of the Amazonian umbrellabird. The specific epithet glabricollis is from the Latin glaber, meaning bald, and collis, meaning necked. It is monotypic.

Description 
The bare-necked umbrellabird is a large, bulky, and crow-like bird, being the largest passerine in its range. It is also among the largest of the cotingas, with only the Amazonian umbrellabird being larger.

Distribution and habitat 
The bare-necked umbrellabird is found in Panama, Costa Rica, and southern Nicaragua. It inhabits the subcanopy to upper understory of primary forest throughout its range, although some birds have been seen foraging in secondary forest. It can also be found in areas with dense understory and near fruiting trees.

Behavior and ecology

Diet 
The bare-necked umbrellabird is mainly frugivorous, feeding on Marcgraviaceae, Urticaceae, Arecaceae, Lauraceae and Annonaceae berries, along with other fruits. It has also been known to feed on lizards, frogs, insects and larvae. Fruits are plucked from vegetation in flight or gleaned with heavy hops. A juvenile was also observed eating arthropods that were flushed out by a swarm of army ants in Costa Rica.

Breeding 
Breeding occurs between March and June in Costa Rica and between April and September in Panama. Like other cotingas, male bare-necked umbrellabirds perform leks to attract females.

Status 
It is listed as endangered on the IUCN Red List. Its global population is estimated to be less than 2,500 mature individuals and decreasing.

References

Cited text 
Chaves-Campos, J., Arévalo, J., & Araya, M. (2003). Altitudinal movements and conservation of Bare-necked Umbrellabird Cephalopterus glabricollis of the Tilarán Mountains, Costa Rica. Bird Conservation International, 13(1), 45–58. doi:10.1017/S0959270903003046

Further reading
 Snow, D.W. (1982). The Cotingas: Bellbirds, Umbrella birds and their allies. British Museum Press. 

bare-necked umbrellabird
Birds of the Talamancan montane forests
bare-necked umbrellabird
Taxonomy articles created by Polbot